This is the discography for Australian musician Lisa Gerrard.

Microfilm 

 Microfilm: Centerfold  ("Centerfold" and "Window") (1980) Vinyl, 7-inch, Single.
 Microfilm: Compilation entitled "From Belgrave with Love" ("Mossaic" by Liza Gerrard and "Summer House" by Microfilm) (1981) 12-inch, LP.

Dead Can Dance

Career after Dead Can Dance 

Solo Albums
 The Mirror Pool (1995)
 The Silver Tree (2006), release on iTunes and by Rubber Records and re-released in 2010 by Gerrard Records
 The Best of Lisa Gerrard (2007)
 The Black Opal (2009) released by Gerrard Records
 Twilight Kingdom (2014) released by Gerrard Records
Singles
 "Sanvean" (1995)
 "The Human Game" (with Pieter Bourke, 1998)
 "Abwoon" (with Patrick Cassidy, 2003)
 "Hommage A Polska. 17 września" (with Klaus Schulze, 2009)
 Coming Home (2010) released by Gerrard Records
 Entry (2010) released by Gerrard Records
 Come This Way (2010) released by Gerrard Records
 Seven Seas (2014) released by Gerrard Records
Collaboration albums
 Duality (1998), with Pieter Bourke
 Immortal Memory (2004), with Patrick Cassidy
 Ashes and Snow (2006) with Patrick Cassidy
 Farscape (2008) with Klaus Schulze
 Rheingold (2008) with Klaus Schulze
 Dziękuję Bardzo (2009) with Klaus Schulze
 "Come Quietly" (2009) with Klaus Schulze
 Departum (2010) with Marcello De Francisci
 The Trail of Genghis Khan (2010) with Cye Wood
 Big in Europe (2013–14) with Klaus Schulze
 The Sum of Its Parts (2015) with Chicane
 Wyld's Call, Armello OST from Armello (2015) with Michael Allen
 Hiraeth (2018) with David Kuckhermann
 BooCheeMish (2018) with The Mystery Of The Bulgarian Voices
 Melodies Of My Youth (2019) with Zbigniew Preisner and Dominik Wania
 Symphony No. 3: Symphony Of Sorrowful Songs (2020) with Yordan Kamdzhalov and The Genesis Orchestra
 Burn (2021) with Jules Maxwell

Miscellaneous
 Compilation entitled "From Belgrave with Love" ("Mossaic" by Lisa Gerrard and "Summer house" by Microfilm) 1981
 The Future Sound of London sample her vocals from the song "Dawn of the Iconoclast" for their 1992 hit single "Papua New Guinea" (1992)
 French promo CD-single "La bas" and "Lament"
 Compilation entitled "These Wings without Feathers" ("Dreamsong" and "Untitled") (1996)
 Guest performer for the industrial/electronic music group Delerium entitled "Forgotten Worlds" on the album Karma (1997)
 "The Wings of a Film – The Music of Hans Zimmer" ("Now We Are Free" live)
 With Orbital: "One Perfect Sunrise" on the album The Blue Album (2004)
 Orbital featuring Lisa Gerrard: "One Perfect Sunrise" (radio mix) CD single
 Orbital featuring Lisa Gerrard: "One Perfect Sunrise" (Phil Hartnoll mix) CD single
 With Denez Prigent: "J'attends – Gortoz A Ran" with Denez Prigent on the album Irvi
 "An Hini a Garan" with Denez Prigent on the album Sarac'h
 Mantras of a Lost Archetype (unreleased solo album)
 The Ashes and Snow art exhibition by Gregory Colbert, (with Patrick Cassidy and Michael Brook, "Devota", "Vespers", "Womb", "Wisdom")
 View from a Window collaborative song recording in track title "There in Your Arms" (2008) with Josiah Brooks
 "Wisdom of Wind" composition with Jeff Rona, recorded by Tarja Turunen for her album My Winter Storm (2007) and present in the "Enough" single (2009)
 "The Storm", song in collaboration with Hungarian composer Balázs Havasi on the album Symphonic II (2013)
 "Lament" and "Epitaph", collaboration with Polish composer Zbigniew Preisner on the album Diaries of Hope (2013)

Movie score composing and contributions 

 Dèmoni 2 (1986) (as Dead Can Dance)
 El Niño de la Luna (1989) (as Dead Can Dance, also with Gerrard in her acting debut)
 Baraka (1992) (as Dead Can Dance, with Michael Stearns)
 Heat (1995) featured previously recorded material from The Mirror Pool
 Nadro (1998)
 The 13th Warrior (1999) with Graeme Revell (score later withdrawn)
 The Insider: Soundtrack (1999), with Pieter Bourke
 Gladiator (2000) with Hans Zimmer
 Gladiator: More Music From the Motion Picture (2000, released 2001) with Hans Zimmer
 Mission: Impossible 2 (2000) with Hans Zimmer
 Black Hawk Down (2001) – Song: "J'attends – Gortoz A Ran" with Denez Prigent
 Ali (2001) with Pieter Bourke
 9/11 (2002) – Song: "Sorrow" composed with Hans Zimmer
 Whale Rider (2003)
 Tears of the Sun (2003) with Hans Zimmer
 The West Wing (Television) (2003) – Song: "Sanvean" in the episode 7A WF 83429
 King Arthur (2004) – Song: "Amergin's Invocation"
 One Perfect Day (2004)
 The Passion of the Christ (2004) with Patrick Cassidy (score withdrawn)
 Man on Fire (2004) with Harry Gregson-Williams
 'Salem's Lot (TV mini-series) (2004) with Patrick Cassidy and Christopher Gordon
 Layer Cake (2004)
 A Thousand Roads (2005) with Jeff Rona
 Constantine (2005) (score incomplete and withdrawn)
 Fateless (2005) with Ennio Morricone ("A song", "A Voice from the Inside", "Return to the Life")
 Seoul Train (2005)
 The Greater Meaning of Water (2006) previously recorded material
 The Mist (2007) (The Host of Seraphim)
  Playing for Charlie (2008)
 Ichi (2008) with Michael Edwards
 Henry Poole Is Here (2008)
 Balibo (2009)
 Ryomaden (2010) Theme Song to TV Series
 From Ararat to Zion (2010) with Ara Torosyan
 Legend of the Guardians: The Owls of Ga'Hoole (2010) -"The Host of the Seraphim" (DCD) and "Coming Home" (solo).
 Oranges and Sunshine (2010)
 Tears of Gaza (2010)
 Samsara (sequel to Baraka) composer of original music, with Michael Stearns and Marcello De Francisci
 Priest – vocals and additional music
 Rurouni Kenshin (2012)
 Man of Steel (2012) – trailer: "Elegy"
  I, Frankenstein (2013)
  The Bible (2013) with Hans Zimmer
  Son of God (2014) with Hans Zimmer
  The Water Diviner (2014)
  Tanna (2015)
  Jane Got a Gun (2015)
  2:22 (2017) with James Orr
  Zack Snyder's Justice League (2021) – Trailer (Mixed with "Praxis" by TOTEM)

Video game composing and contributions 
 Deus Ex: Human Revolution (2011)
 Armello (2015) with Michael Allen

References 

Discographies of Australian artists
Rock music discographies